Edward J. Kennedy Jr. (born March 24, 1951) is an American politician, and member of the Massachusetts Senate from the 1st Middlesex district. He has previously served as the 90th Mayor of Lowell (2016–2018).

Education and early life
Kennedy holds a Master's Degree in Public Administration from Framingham State University, and a Bachelor of Arts degree from Boston University.

Prior to being elected to the Senate, he worked as a commercial real estate appraiser. He is a long-time member of the Massachusetts Democratic State Committee, the Sierra Club and the Appalachian Mountain Club.

Political career

Kennedy served on the city council for Lowell, Massachusetts, from 1978 through 1985, and on the county commission for Middlesex County, Massachusetts, from 1992 through 1996. After his time on the Lowell City Council and Middlesex Commission, he decided to run for Middlesex County Sheriff in 1996. Kennedy lost the Democratic nomination to Sheriff James DiPaola. He tried another run in 1998, but lost the nomination to DiPaola, once more. He was again elected to the Lowell City Council in 2011, after a 27 year hiatus from it, and a 13 year hiatus from politics. Then he was re-elected again in 2014, 2016, and 2018. But, during his third-straight term in 2016, he was elected to be Lowell's 90th mayor after the City Council's 9–0 vote. After his stint as Mayor, and with 20 years of government experience in his back pocket, Kennedy decided to run for higher office. After a close fought Democratic Primary, then a swift general election night win, he was elected to the Massachusetts Senate. Kennedy was sworn in on January 2, 2019.

Current committee membership 
Kennedy currently serves on seven legislative committees in the Massachusetts Legislature:

 Joint Committee on Tourism, Arts and Cultural Development (Chair)
 Joint Committee on Community Development and Small Businesses (Vice Chair)
 Joint Committee on Elder Affairs
 Joint Committee on Election Laws
 Joint Committee on Environment, Natural Resources and Agriculture
 Joint Committee on Higher Education
 Joint Committee on Municipalities and Regional Government

Personal life
In his free time, Kennedy hikes, spends time with his three grandsons, and enjoys the variety of dining and cultural options available throughout Greater Lowell. He is married to Susan kennedy.

Electoral history

See also
 2019–2020 Massachusetts legislature
 2021–2022 Massachusetts legislature

References

External links

Living people
Democratic Party Massachusetts state senators
Mayors of Lowell, Massachusetts
Massachusetts city council members
County commissioners in Massachusetts
1951 births
21st-century American politicians